Robert Roszel (born 30 January 1983 in Căpleni, Satu Mare County) is a Romanian footballer of German ethnicity who plays for Nyirbátori FC on loan from Cigánd SE. Roszel has been plagued by injuries since 2004, which made him lose a year and a half of playing time. He was also a Romanian Under-19 international scoring two goals for the U-19 team. Roszel is a striker.

References

External links

1983 births
Living people
People from Satu Mare County
Romanian footballers
FC Olimpia Satu Mare players
Liga I players
CFR Cluj players
ACF Gloria Bistrița players
FC UTA Arad players
CS Minaur Baia Mare (football) players
SCM Râmnicu Vâlcea players
Expatriate footballers in Hungary
Diósgyőri VTK players
Romanian expatriate sportspeople in Hungary
Association football forwards